Kwai Tsing is one of the 18 districts of Hong Kong. It consists of two parts - Kwai Chung and Tsing Yi Island. Kwai Tsing is part of the New Territories. It had a population of 520,572 in 2016. The district has the third least educated residents and their income is below average.

Kwai Tsing did not exist as a standalone district when Hong Kong's District Boards were formed in the early 1980s. It remained as a part of Tsuen Wan district until 1985. The newly created district was known as Kwai Chung and Tsing Yi District until 1988, when its name was shortened to Kwai Tsing District.

The internationally famous container terminals can be found within the district, along the shores of Rambler Channel between Kwai Chung and Tsing Yi Island. The Tsing Ma Bridge, leading to the Hong Kong International Airport through the North Lantau Highway, starts at the northwestern end of Tsing Yi Island.

Over 75% of the district residents live in public housing.

History
In 1669, the Qing dynasty forced the people in Hong Kong and the coastal regions such as Guangdong, Guangxi, Fujian, etc., to move to the inland areas of mainland China. After this move inland policy ceased, a large number of Hakka people from the Huayang region of Guangdong province, as well as the Hakka districts of Fujian province, moved to what is now Shenzhen and Hong Kong. Traditionally, Kwai Tsing District has been a Hakka speaking region; the original inhabitants of the villages in this area were mainly of Hakka extraction.

Geography
Kwai Tsing District borders in the north and west with Tsuen Wan District, east with Sha Tin District, southeast with Sham Shui Po District and Yau Tsim Mong District (marine), south with Central and Western District (marine), and southwest with Islands District (marine liners and similar).

Constituencies

2003
By 2003 District Councils Election, the Kwai Tsing District Council is divided into 28 constituencies:

Kwai Chung 
Cho Yiu
Kwai Chung Estate
Kwai Fong
Kwai Hing
Kwai Shing East Estate
Kwai Shing West Estate
Hing Fong
Lai King
Lai Wah
Lai Yiu
On Yam
Shek Lei
Shek Lei Extension
Shek Yam
Tai Pak Tin
Upper Tai Wo Hau
Lower Tai Wo Hau

Tsing Yi
Cheung Ching
Cheung Hang
Cheung Hong
Cheung On
Ching Fat
Greenfield
On Ho
Shing Hong
Tsing Yi Estate
Tsing Yi South
Wai Ying

2015
It has 29 constituencies in 2015 election.

S01 Kwai Hing
S02 Kwai Shing East Estate
S03 Upper Tai Wo Hau
S04 Lower Tai Wo Hau
S05 Kwai Chung Estate North
S06 Kwai Chung Estate South
S07 Shek Yam
S08 On Yam
S09 Shek Lei South
S10 Shek Lei North
S11 Tai Pak Tin
S12 Kwai Fong
S13 Wah Lai
S14 Lai Wah
S15 Cho Yiu
S16 Hing Fong
S17 Lai King
S18 Kwai Shing West Estate
S19 On Ho
S20 Wai Ying
S21 Tsing Yi Estate
S22 Greenfield
S23 Cheung Ching
S24 Cheung Hong
S25 Shing Hong
S26 Tsing Yi South
S27 Cheung Hang
S28 Ching Fat
S29 Cheung On

Town centre
The district is part of Tsuen Wan New Town. Unlike other new towns in Hong Kong, the district has no clear town core in the course of development. Cores emerge only after Metroplaza in Kwai Fong and Maritime Square in Tsing Yi was built, but they are still incomparable to their counterparts in other new towns in Hong Kong.

Industry
Industry is an integral part of the district. Both light and heavy industries share substantial land in the district.

Education

Like other early new towns of Hong Kong, the district was primary for settling the influx of Chinese population around the year of the change of sovereignty in China in 1949 and the baby boom afterwards. Public housing estates were built throughout the district. Many schools have been established by various charities and religious organisations. Some have provided vocational training for industries in Hong Kong while some have become liberal schools. As the community has aged, the number of school children declined after the 2000s, and schools are facing survival problems.

Secondary schools in 2006:

Buddhist Sin Tak College
Buddhist Yip Kei Nam Memorial College
Caritas St. Joseph Secondary School
Carmel Alison Lam Foundation Secondary School
CCC Chuen Yuen College
CCC Yenching College
CNEC Christian College
CNEC Lee I Yao Memorial Secondary School
Cotton Spinners Association Secondary School
Daughters of Mary Help of Christians Siu Ming Catholic Secondary School
Ha Kwai Chung Government Secondary School
HKSYC & IA Chan Nam Chong Memorial College
Hong Kong Taoist Association the Yuen Yuen Institute No.1 Secondary School
Ju Ching Chu Secondary School (Kwai Chung)
Kiangsu-Chekiang College (Kwai Chung)
Kwai Chung Methodist College
Lai King Catholic Secondary School
Lingnan Dr Chung Wing Kwong Memorial Secondary School
Lions College
Lok Sin Tong Ku Chiu Man Secondary School
Lok Sin Tong Leung Chik Wai Memorial School
Po Leung Kuk Lo Kit Sing (1983) College
Pope Paul VI College
Queen's College Old Boys' Association Secondary School
Salesians of Don Bosco Ng Siu Mui Secondary School
Shek Lei Catholic Secondary School
Sheung Kwai Chung Government Secondary School
Shun Tak Fraternal Association Lee Shau Kee College
Sheng Kung Hui Lam Woo Memorial Secondary School
The Methodist Lee Wai Lee College
Tung Wah Group of Hospitals Chen Zao Men College
Tung Wah Group of Hospitals Mrs Wu York Yu Memorial College
Tung Wah Group of Hospitals S. C. Gaw Memorial College

Leisure
There are several sports grounds in the district. Biu Chun Rangers are based in Tsing Yi. Kwai Tsing Theatre in Kwai Fong is gradually becoming an important performance venue in Hong Kong.

Transport
The usual forms of transportation in the district are buses, minibuses and metro.

The MTR (metro) Tsuen Wan line has four stations on three lines running through the district:
 Lai King is the southernmost, and the interchange between Tsuen Wan and Tung Chung line.
 The Tsuen Wan line then runs through two stations (Kwai Fong, Kwai Hing) before exiting the district for Tsuen Wan.
 Tung Chung line diverges to the west to Tsing Yi Island and have a station, Tsing Yi, there.
 Tsing Yi station is also served by Airport Express, which is the last station before reaching the Airport.
Bus
Kowloon Motor Bus: 6, 30, 31, 31A, 31B, 32, 32H, 32M, 33A, 34, 35A, 35X, 36A, 36B, 36M, 36X, 37, 37M, 38, 38A, 38B, 38P, 40, 40A, 40E, 40P, 40S, 40X, 41, 41A, 41M, 42, 42A, 42C, 42M, 43, 43A, 43B, 43C, 43D, 43M, 43S, 44, 44M, 45, 46, 46P, 46S, 46X, 47A, 47X, 48X, 49P, 49X, 57M, 58M, 58P, 59A, 60X, 61M, 67A, 67M, 68A, 68E, 69M, 69P, 73D, 73P, 73X, 234C, 234D, 235, 235M, 237A, 240X, 242X, 243M, 243P, 248M, 249M, 249X, 260C, 265B, 265M, 269A, 269M, 269P, 272P, 278A, 278P, 278X, 279A, 279B, 279X, 290, 290A, 290B, 290X, N41X, N237, N241, N252, N260, N269, N290, X42C, X42P
Long Win Bus: A31, A32, E31, E32, E32A, E42, E42P, N31, NA31, NA32
Citybus: 50, A20, E21, E21A, E21C, N21, N21A, NA20
Cross Harbour Tunnel: 171, 171A, 171P, 904, 905, 905A, 905P, 930, 930B, 935, 936, 936A, 948, 948A, 948B, 948E, 948P, 948X, N171, N930

See also
 List of places in Hong Kong

References

External links
Kwai Tsing District Council
Tsuen Wan New Town
List and map of electoral constituencies (large PDF file)